The slang term Chad  originated in the UK, where it was used to describe a particular humorous ad-hoc cartoon, and later  in Chicago it was used as a pejorative term for young, upper-class, urban males. In modern internet slang, the term can be similar to "bro"  and generally refers to an "alpha male" or otherwise obnoxious hyper-masculine yuppie male.

Origins
The slang term "Chad" originated in the UK during World War II and was employed in a similar humorous manner as "Kilroy was here". It later came into use in Chicago as a derogatory way to describe a young urban American man, typically single and in his twenties or early thirties.

In Chicago, the term was covered by a satirical website dedicated to the Lincoln Park Chad Society, a fictional social club based in Chicago's upscale Lincoln Park neighborhood. A Chad was originally depicted as originating in Chicago's affluent North Shore suburbs (Highland Park, Evanston, Deerfield, Northbrook, Glenview, Glencoe, Winnetka, Wilmette, or Lake Forest), receiving a BMW for his 16th birthday, obtaining a law or business degree from a Big Ten university, belonging to a fraternity, moving to Lincoln Park, marrying a "Trixie", and then moving back to the North Shore suburbs.

Manosphere

The term later came into use in incel forums to refer to sexually active "alpha males". Within the manosphere, Chads are viewed as constituting the top decile in terms of genetic fitness. In online animation drawings in the manosphere, a Chad is further tagged with an explicit last name and is often depicted as a muscular blond man and with very pronounced masculine features. One such depiction, in the "Virgin vs. Chad" internet meme of the late 2010s, contrasts an introverted and insecure "Virgin" with a muscular and egotistical "Chad". Chads are sometimes portrayed as the opposite to "omega" or "beta" males, and as physically attractive. The term Chad is sometimes used interchangeably with slayer. Due to their characterisation as being genetically gifted and privileged—though sometimes depicted as shallow, air-headed, arrogant, and overtly sexual—the term Chad is used in both a pejorative and complimentary way on incel forums.

The female counterpart to the Chad, in slang, is the Stacy, or originally, the Trixie.

See also

 Basic (slang)
 Becky (slang)
 Benny (slang)
 Bro (subculture)
 Essex man
 Frat boy
 Jock (stereotype)
 Karen (slang)
 Metrosexual
 Preppy
 Yuppie

References

External links

 
 

Class-related slurs
Culture of Chicago
European-American culture in Chicago
Internet slang
Manosphere
Men in the United States
Pejorative terms for white people
Slang terms for men
Social class in the United States
Social class subcultures
Social groups
Stereotypes of urban people
Stereotypes of white Americans
Stereotypes of white men
White American culture in Chicago
Youth culture in the United States